Empress Qi (齊皇后, personal name unknown) was an empress of the Qiang-led Chinese Later Qin dynasty. Her husband was Yao Xing (Emperor Wenhuan).

Very little is known about Empress Qi. It isn't certain when she died. She was promoted to empress from the imperial consort title Zhaoyi (昭儀) in 412.  No further reference was made to her in history, including when she died or whether she had any children.

References 

|- style="text-align: center;"

|-

|-

Later Qin empresses
Year of death unknown
Year of birth unknown